Cannabis in Germany is legal for certain limited medical contexts, but illegal for recreational usage, though possession of minor amounts is not always prosecuted. As of 2022, approximately 4 million adults in Germany use cannabis.

After the 2021 German federal election, the resulting coalition announced in their coalition agreement they plan to legalise cannabis for purposes of recreation, although concrete legislation to this effect has not yet been introduced. A study conducted by the University of Düsseldorf in 2021 reported that legalising cannabis could raise more than €4.7 billion in additional revenue in Germany.

Medical cannabis 
Dronabinol was rescheduled in 1994 from annex I to annex II of the Narcotics Law (Betäubungsmittelgesetz) in order to ease research; in 1998 dronabinol was rescheduled from annex II to annex III and since then has been available by prescription. whereas Δ9-THC is still listed in annex I. Manufacturing instructions for dronabinol containing compendial formulations are described in the Neues Rezeptur-Formularium.

Although Δ9-THC is still listed in annex I, in a few cases, patients have been able to obtain from the federal drug authority a special permit to import natural cannabis through a pharmacy. Manufacturing instructions for dronabinol containing compendial formulations are described in the Neues Rezeptur-Formularium.

In February 2008, seven German patients were legally being treated with medicinal cannabis, distributed by prescription in pharmacies.

On 4 May 2016, the Cabinet of Germany approved legislation allowing the use of cannabis for seriously ill patients who have consulted with a doctor and "have no therapeutic alternative". German Health Minister Hermann Gröhe presented the legal draft on the legalisation of medical cannabis to the cabinet which took effect on 10 March 2017. Licenses will be given by "Federal Institute for Drugs and Medical Devices" to companies for growing medical cannabis  and import  according to strict EU-GMP standards. As of March 2017, the seriously ill can obtain cannabis with a doctor's prescription, paid for by health insurance.

Enforcement 

The German narcotics law (Betäubungsmittelgesetz) states that authorities are not required to prosecute for the possession of a "minor amount" of any narcotic drug meant for personal consumption, except in cases "of public interest", i.e. consumption in public, in front of minors or within a public school or a state prison.

Under German law, the consumption itself of narcotics is not illegal: legally speaking, it is considered as non-punishable self-harm. Legal commentaries recognise that it is possible to consume drugs without having bought them first, in a legal sense. This has the practical effect that a positive drug test does not necessarily mean that one has illegally purchased them.

Despite the fact that there is no punishment de jure, consumers can be forced to undergo a medical-psychological assessment (MPU) to assess their driving suitability. Loss of drivers licence is not uncommon, followed by a regime of drug screenings to prove the suitability. Unlike for ethanol, whether one operated a motor vehicle under the influence (or indeed with trace amounts of THC in the bloodstream) is often immaterial.

Hemp Parade 

The Hanfparade is a hemp legalisation demonstration in Berlin. It has taken place each year in August since 1997.

Global Marijuana March 

The Global Marijuana March has taken place in Germany since 2011 and gets coordinated by the Deutscher Hanfverband (German Hemp Association).

Hemp museum 
The Hanfmuseum was established in Berlin in 1994.

Hemp food 
Non-psychoactive foods made with hemp seeds (less than 0.2% THC) are very common in German health food shops such as Reformhaus. Since the late 2010s, Hemp foods and drinks have become widely available even in normal supermarkets in some cities including Berlin, and health food shops and drug stores like dm and Rossmann have begun selling various CBD products, sometimes including THC-free cannabis.

Politics 

The Greens, The Left, and the Free Democratic Party want the government to legalise the regulation of cannabis for private consumption. They say that this will help protect adult consumers from buying cannabis laced with other harmful chemicals. They also say that buying cannabis on the black market stigmatises ordinary citizens, preventing them from seeking help if they need it and increasing the chance that they will buy harder drugs. Cannabis shops would eliminate this risk and prevent minors from buying the drug with the implementation of legal minimum age checks for purchase.

2021 German federal election 
In the coalition talks between the SPD, the Greens and the FDP that followed the federal election in 2021, the proposal arose within the framework of a government that was to be formed to release cannabis for legal distribution to adults and to sell it in licensed specialist shops in the future.

2022 legalisation 
In January 2022, Federal Minister of Justice Marco Buschmann stated that the ministry was drafting cannabis regulations, but the date of legalisation would be up to the Ministry of Health. A 2022 German cannabis legalization framework was introduced in October. The German health minister wants to make it legal for adults to purchase and own up to 30g (1 oz) of cannabis for recreational use and to privately grow up to three plants.

References 

Cannabis in Germany